An indirect presidential election (officially the 2nd Federal Convention) was held in West Germany on 17 July 1954. The government parties and the opposition SPD renominated incumbent Theodor Heuss. Against his wishes, the Communist Party of Germany nominated Alfred Weber. Heuss was reelected on the first ballot with about 85% of the vote.

Composition of the Federal Convention 
The President is elected by the Federal Convention consisting of all the members of the Bundestag and an equal number of delegates representing the states. These are divided proportionally by population to each state, and each state's delegation is divided among the political parties represented in its parliament so as to reflect the partisan proportions in the parliament.

Source: Eine Dokumentation aus Anlass der Wahl des Bundespräsidenten am 18. März 2012

Results

Note:1. In addition to the two formally nominated candidates President of the Reich Karl Dönitz, Prince Louis Ferdinand of Prussia, Marie Elisabeth Lüders, Prince Ernest Augustus of Hanover, Franz-Josef Wuermeling, and Chancellor Konrad Adenauer received one vote each.

References

Presidential election
1954
West German presidential election
West German presidential election
Theodor Heuss